In Gliding, in the United Kingdom, CB SIFT BEC is the standard mnemonic to prompt a series of checks prior to take-off.

The CB SIFT BEC acronym stands for:
Controls
Ballast
Straps
Instruments
Flaps
Trim
Brakes
Eventualities
Canopy

For many years the checklist was CB SIFT CBE but was changed towards the end of 2018 so that the canopy is the final item before take-off. This brought the checklist in line with common practice, and acknowledged that pilots often want to leave the canopy open on sunny summer days, to avoid overheating, and on cold, humid winter days to avoid the canopy misting up.

In the late 1970s the RAF Cadet Gliding Schools in the UK used CB SIT CB.

Controls 
Move each control individually, checking for full and free movements, with no restrictions.

Controls have full and free movements. Pilots usually use the 4 corners movement. pointing their joystick in each corner using the edge of their control area. One limit with this can be dependant on the other pilot's legs.

Ballast 
Check to ensure the aircraft is being flown within the placard weight limits.

Ballast is to check the weight of the pilots. The more weight the more higher its maneuverability becomes but a higher loss of height due to weight. Pilots will always see a small paper sheet on the side of their aircraft to show who the Front pilot must weigh and back pilot must weigh. the closer weights the better. If a pilot is too lightweight they may add a specialized weight to the underside of their seat.

Straps 
Ensure the straps of both pilots are on and secure. If you are the flying in the aircraft solo, ensure the straps in the rear cockpit and will not interfere with any of the controls.

Straps on and secure. G strap, Waist straps and shoulder straps. The G strap helps the pilot(s) to handle high G's. These are also used to protect their heads for injuries. All straps can be disconnected via the twistable knob which will sit above the crotch area

Instruments 
Ensure that where appropriate, the instruments are set to zero, i.e. , altimeter. Check that the instruments are reading correctly, no broken glass and the panel is secure. Also check that the electric power is turned on.

Altimeter set to zero, instruments reading correctly and no broken glass. Panel is secure.

Flaps 
Not all glider have flaps. If fitted, the flaps should be moved through their full range of movement, then set for take-off.

Flaps not fitted or Flaps have full have full and free movement and set for take-off

Trim 
The trim lever, often green, should be moved through its full range of movement, then set for take-off.

Trim fully forward, fully back and set for take-off.

Brakes 
The brakes, often the blue lever, should be opened fully and check they are symmetrical. Then close until half brakes and then check they are symmetrical. Close the brakes and check the are closed both sides. Finally lock brakes.

Brakes full and symmetrical, brake half and symmetrical. Brakes closed and locked.

Eventualities 
The check is in the event of a launch failure, I will obtain a minimum approach speed of

50kt, 55kt, 60kt etc.  (You must decide approach speed depending on current wind speed)

and land ahead if possible. If I can not land ahead, I will turn downwind, which today is left/right and complete an aborted circuit. If a wing drops, I will release the cable and land ahead.

Canopy 
Lower the canopy, close and lock it. Apply an upward force on the canopy to make sure it is secure.

Canopy down and locked.

References

Aviation mnemonics
Gliding